In the hepatic lobule of the human digestive system, the space of Möll lies between the limiting plate and the connective tissue of the portal triad.  It receives lymph from the space of Disse and drains it into the surrounding lymphatic vessels.

References

Hepatology